Sasha Jankovic may refer to:

Saša Janković (born 1970), Ombudsman of the Republic of Serbia
Aleksandar Janković (born 1972), Serbian football coach